FritzFrog is a decentralized botnet that uses P2P protocols to distribute control over all of its nodes, thereby avoiding having one controller or single point of failure.

References

Botnets